Justus Kavulanya (born 19 September 1968) is a Kenyan racewalker. He competed in the men's 20 kilometres walk at the 1996 Summer Olympics.

References

1968 births
Living people
Athletes (track and field) at the 1996 Summer Olympics
Kenyan male racewalkers
Olympic athletes of Kenya
Place of birth missing (living people)